This is a list of state prisons in New Hampshire overseen by the state Department of Corrections. It does not include federal prisons or county jails located in the state of New Hampshire.

Lakes Region Facility (closed 2009)
New Hampshire State Prison for Men
New Hampshire State Prison for Women
Northern New Hampshire Correctional Facility
Shea Farm Halfway House

New Hampshire
Prisons